Mihai Ionuț Morar (born 14 October 1981 in Baia Mare) is a Romanian TV presenter, editor and DJ.

Morar hosts the morning show Radio Zu, with Daniel Buzdugan, and show Răi da' Buni on Antena 2. In 2011 he was part of the jury on the Romanian X Factor.

In 2018 the presenter was chosen by 20th Century Fox to provide the Romanian voice of Alvin in the live-action movie Alvin and the Chipmunks: The Road Chip, alongside Antonia (Jeanette) and Andreea Antonescu (Brittany) for the Romanian version.

References

1981 births
People from Baia Mare
Romanian television presenters
Romanian DJs
Living people